Michalski (feminine Michalska; plural Michalscy) is a Polish surname. It may refer to:

 Adam Michalski (born 1988), Polish volleyball player
 Aenne Michalsky (1908–1986), Austrian operatic soprano
 Anna Jagaciak-Michalska (born 1990), Polish athlete
 Arkadiusz Michalski (born 1990), Polish weightlifter
 Artur Michalski (born 1962), Polish diplomat and journalist
 Bożena Bednarek-Michalska (1957–2021), Polish librarian
 Carl Michalski (1911–1998), German composer and conductor
 Clemens Michalski (1902–1977), American politician from Milwaukee, Wisconsin
 Damian Michalski (born 1998), Polish footballer
 Daniel Michalski (born 2000), Polish tennis player
 Darren Michalski (born 1968), rugby league player
 Donald Michalski (born 1955), Canadian volleyball player
 Freddy Michalski (1946–2020), French translator
 Gerhard Michalski (1917–1946), German Luftwaffe pilot
 Grzegorz Michalski (born 1972), Polish economist, researcher 
 Hans Michalsky (born 1949), German cyclist
 Jan Michalski Prize, Swiss literary prize
 Jen Michalski (born 1972), American writer
 Jerry Michalski, American technology consultant
 Jerzy Michalski, Polish economist and minister of finance 26.09.1921-02.06.1922 pl
 Jerzy Michalski (1924–2007), Polish historian
 Jodie Michalska (born 1986), English footballer
 Johannes Michalski (1936–2019), American painter
 John "Mouse" Michalski (born 1948), American founder and guitarist of Count Five
 Julia Michalska (born 1985), Polish rower
 Kacper Michalski (born 2000), Polish football 
 Konstanty Michalski (1879–1947), Polish Catholic theologian
 Krzysztof Michalski (1948–2013), Polish philosopher
 Łukasz Michalski (born 1988), Polish athlete
 Maciej Michalski (born 1981), Polish film director
 Madeleine Ouellette-Michalska (born 1930), Canadian writer
 Marcin Michalski (born 1958), Polish basketball player
 Marianna Michalska (1901–1959), Polish-American dancer and actress better known as Gilda Gray
 Mateusz Michalski (born 1987), Polish Paralympic athlete
Mateusz Michalski (born 1991), Polish professional footballer 
Mateusz Michalski (born 1992), Polish international ice hockey player
 Mateusz Michalski (born 1988), Polish Paralympic swimmer
 Michael Michalsky (born 1967), German fashion designer
 Piotr Michalski (born 1994), Polish speed skater
 Radosław Michalski (born 1969), Polish footballer
 Raymond Michalski (born 1933), American operatic bass-baritone
 René Picado Michalski (1905–1956), Costa Rican politician
 Ryszard S. Michalski (1937–2007), Polish-American computer scientist
 Seweryn Michalski (born 1994), Polish footballer
 Stanisław Michalski (1932–2011), Polish actor
 Teodoro Picado Michalski (1900–1960), President of Costa Rica
 Vera Michalski (born 1934), Swiss billionaire, significant shareholder of Roche Holding
 Wacław Michalski, Polish Olympic rower
 Wacław Waldemar Michalski (born 1938), Polish poet
 Zdzisław Michalski (1928–1985), Polish Olympic rower

See also
 
 

Polish-language surnames